Red chalk can refer to:

 Sanguine for the material used for drawing
 Hunstanton Formation for the now obsolete stratigraphic term 'Red Chalk' employed in the geology of eastern England.